Abarghan Rural District is in the Central District of Sarab County, East Azerbaijan province, Iran. At the National Census of 2006, its population was 13,529 in 2,910 households. There were 12,239 inhabitants in 3,284 households at the following census of 2011. At the most recent census of 2016, the population of the rural district was 10,780 in 3,206 households. The largest of its 26 villages was Daman Jan, with 1,847 people.

References 

Sarab County

Rural Districts of East Azerbaijan Province

Populated places in East Azerbaijan Province

Populated places in Sarab County